Such Jubilee is the fourth studio album by North Carolina folk duo Mandolin Orange, currently known as Watchhouse. It was released on May 5, 2015 through Yep Roc Records.

Background
Andrew Marlin said the following about the song "Blue Ruin" on their website, which he wrote about the Sandy Hook Elementary School shooting:

"I was thinking about all those kids who wouldn’t be there on Christmas morning. People can get so heated and so serious about change and addressing gun violence when something that traumatic happens, but a month or two afterwards, they've all cooled down and it's not in the forefront of their thoughts anymore. But two years later, those kids still aren't around on Christmas morning and their parents are still dealing with that."

Track listing

Personnel

 Andrew Marlin – vocals, mandolin, acoustic guitar, bass, banjo, snare
 Emily Frantz – vocals, violin, acoustic guitar, electric guitar (on "Blue Ruin")
 Josh Oliver – electric guitar, Wurlitzer, backing vocals (on "From Now On" and "Jump Mountain Blues"), and acoustic guitar (on "That Wrecking Ball")

References

2015 albums
Yep Roc Records albums
Watchhouse albums